Odontivalvia is a genus of moths of the family Crambidae. It contains only one species, Odontivalvia radialis, which is found in North America, where it has been recorded from Texas.

Larvae have been recorded feeding on Leucophyllum minus. They create silken tunnels covered with frass, attached to the branches of the host plant.

References

Natural History Museum Lepidoptera genus database

Odontiini
Taxa named by Eugene G. Munroe
Crambidae genera
Monotypic moth genera